Pierre Frédéric Sarrus (10 March 1798, Saint-Affrique – 20 November 1861) was a French mathematician.

Sarrus was a professor at the University of Strasbourg, France (1826–1856) and a member of the French Academy of Sciences in Paris (1842). He is the author of several treatises, including one on the solution of numeric equations with multiple unknowns (1842); one on multiple integrals and their integrability conditions; and one on the determination of the orbits of the comets. He also discovered a mnemonic rule for solving the determinant of a 3-by-3 matrix, named Sarrus' scheme. Sarrus also demonstrated the fundamental lemma of the calculus of variations.

Sarrus numbers are pseudoprimes to base 2.

Sarrus also developed the Sarrus linkage, the first linkage capable of transforming rotary motion into perfect straight-line motion, and vice versa.

19th-century French mathematicians
Linear algebraists
1798 births
1861 deaths